John Archer Smith is a former coach for Hofstra University's football, baseball and basketball programs. Smith earned 179 wins as the baseball coach for Hofstra, the most in the program's history, with a win percentage of .560.

Head coaching record

Football

References

Year of birth missing (living people)
Living people
Hofstra Pride athletic directors
Hofstra Pride baseball coaches
Hofstra Pride football coaches
Hofstra Pride men's basketball coaches